Pinzgauer may refer to:

 An inhabitant of the Pinzgau, in the state of Salzburg, Austria
 The Pinzgauer Cattle breed
 The Steyr-Puch Pinzgauer, an off-road vehicle
 The Noriker horse breed, also known as Pinzgauer or Norico-Pinzgauer
 The Pinzgauer Lokalbahn, or Pinzgaubahn; a railway in the area.